The Class 1100 locomotives of Nederlandse Spoorwegen were a class of 1,500 V DC Bo′Bo′ electric locomotives, introduced from 1950. They were built by Alsthom to an original design of the French BB 8100. They operated in the Netherlands.

They have been out of service since 1999, although many were out of service before then. They operated all services, freight and passenger, and were the NS' main locomotive until the arrival of Class 1600s. They were extensively rebuilt between 1978 and 1982. 

1156 had an accident near Tilburg in 1961, and 1131 was involved in the largest railway accident in the Netherlands at Harmelen. 1129 was involved in an accident in Westervoort in 1978, this locomotive was not destroyed, and was put back in service. In 1986, 1141 derailed at Heeze. After the 1978 accident, the locomotives were rebuilt slightly to improve driver safety, with a crash-absorbing nose ahead of the cab inspired by the French 'Nez Cassé' design.

In 1991, some of the locos were withdrawn with the arrival of DD-AR double-deck coaching stock, and Class 1700 locos were introduced. 

The 1100 series locomotives were unpopular with NS drivers. The locomotives used an unusual design: the buffers are attached to the bogie instead of the main body. Buffers attached to the main body are a common design feature, which provides a steady ride as the body is stabilized because it is pressed against the car it is pulling. The 1100 series lacked this stability, resulting in a very nervous bouncy ride which can be compared to a ride on a wooden roller coaster. The cabin was designed for French drivers in 1950, and anyone taller than  had a hard time in the nonadjustable driver seat, and air drafted around drivers' lower legs. In operation, cooling fans in the engine compartment produced a remarkably loud roar. For these reasons the locomotives were downright hated, and until 1980, their drivers were paid a special bonus, one originally designated for dirty or unpleasant work.

Preservation

References

External link

1100
Alstom locomotives
1500 V DC locomotives
Bo′Bo′ locomotives
Electric locomotives of the Netherlands
Railway locomotives introduced in 1950
Standard gauge locomotives of the Netherlands
Bo′Bo′ electric locomotives of Europe